The 22890 / 89 / 78 / 77 Puri Digha Express was a Express train belonging to Indian Railways - East Coast Railway zone that runs between Puri and Digha in India.

It was operates as train number 22890 / 78 from Puri to Digha and as train number 22889 / 77 in the reverse direction serving the states of West Bengal and Odisha.

Coaches

The 22890 / 89 Puri Digha Express has 1 AC 2 tier, 1 AC 3 tier, 9 Sleeper Class, 4 General Unreserved & 2 SLR (Seating cum Luggage Rake) Coaches whereas 22878 / 77 Puri Digha Express has 1 AC 2 tier, 1 AC 3 tier, 5 Sleeper Class, 4 General Unreserved & 2 SLR (Seating cum Luggage Rake) Coaches. They do not carry a Pantry car coach.   .

As is customary with most train services in India, Coach Composition may be amended at the discretion of Indian Railways depending on demand.

Service

Routeing

The 22890 / 89 / 78 / 77 Puri Digha Express was runs from Puri via Bhubaneswar, Cuttack, Balasore, Kharagpur Junction to Digha Flag Station   .

Traction

As the route is electrified now a Visakhapatnam or Santragachi based WAP 4 hauls the train from Puri to Digha and Digha to Puri. Sometimes an Asansol-based WAG 5A/P hauls the train from Digha to Puri depending on the availability.

Operation

22878 Puri Digha Express runs from Puri every Wednesday reaching Digha the next day .

22877 Digha Puri Express runs from Digha every Thursday reaching Puri the next day.

22890 Puri Digha Express runs from Puri every Saturday reaching Digha the next day  .

22889 Digha Puri Express runs from Digha every Sunday reaching Puri the next day.

References 

 http://etrain.info/in?TRAIN=22878
 http://www.eastcoastrail.indianrailways.gov.in/view_detail.jsp?lang=0&dcd=513&id=0,4,268
 http://www.business-standard.com/article/economy-policy/new-train-between-puri-and-digha-112021700008_1.html
 http://trainspy.com/static/train/22890/PURI-DGHA-SUP-E
 http://www.pnrstatus.co.in/renumbering-of-trains-with-effect-from-1st-october-2012/
 http://www.eastcoastrail.indianrailways.gov.in/cris/view_detail.jsp?lang=0&id=0,4,268&dcd=673&did=13424464515321094208EF57F1518CD1B4D6610CA23EA.web91
 https://web.archive.org/web/20140929164445/http://orissadiary.com/CurrentNews.asp?id=22808

External links

Defunct trains in India